Bharat Kesri Dangal is freestyle wrestling competition organised by the Haryana Sports and Youth Affairs department to commemorate the martyrdom day of Shaheed Bhagat Singh, Rajguru and Sukhdev.

2017 Competition 
In this year Bharat Kesri Dangal was organized at War Heros Memorial Stadium, Ambala Cantt, Haryana At 6 pm (Evening). It was a free style kushti competition which will be played by both male & female wrestlers. This kushti competition will played under Badalta Haryana Badhta Haryana

Inauguration Ceremony 
Inauguration function will be start on 21 March 2017 at 6:00 PM. This contest will be played at War Heros Memorial Stadium, Ambala Cantt, Haryana. Guests present at the ceremony included CM. Manohar Lal Khattar, Pro Kaptaan Singh Solanki, Shri Anil Vij, Ram Bilash Sharma, Captain Abhiimanu, Shree Om Prakash Dhnakadh, Raav Narveer Singh, Kavita Jain, Krishna Lal Panwar, Vipul Goyal, Manish Kumar Grover, Krishna Kumar Bedi, Dr. Banwari Lal, Nayaab Singh, Brijbhushan Sharan Singh, Ratan Lal Kataria, Shyam Singh, Subhash Barala, Kamal Gupta, Shree Rajiv Mehta, Ashim Goyal, Kamal Gupta, etc.

Schedule of Bharat Kesari Dangal 
 Inauguration: 21 March 2017
 Timing: At 6 pm (Evening)
 Venue: War Heros Memorial Stadium, Ambala Cantt., Haryana
 End of Dangal: 23 March 2017

Prize Money under Bharat Kesari Dangal 2017 
Competition will be held between 5 male & female wrestlers of 10 weight category. Here we have explained prize money to be given to the winners of Bharat Kesari Dangal:

Rs. 1 Crore to winner.

Rs. 50 Lakh will be given to first runner up.

Rs. 25 lakh will be given to second runner up.

Cultural Program 
Here, Haryana Govt. will also organize some cultural program to entertain viewers as you can see below with time and date.

Sources:-

http://www.sarkaridunia.in/bharat-kesari-dangal-2017-check-teams-prize-money-schedule/

http://www.sarkaridunia.in/bharat-kesari-dangal-2017-indias-biggest-malefemale-free-style-kushti-contest/

2016 Competition
2016 edition of Bharat Kesri Dangal would be organised by Haryana Government at Tau Devi Lal Stadium from 21 to 23 March 2016 in association with Indian Olympic Association and Wrestling Federation of India (WFI).

References

Sport in Gurgaon
Wrestling competitions in India